J.Walter a spol. (1911), Akciová továrna automobilů Josef Walter a spol. (1919) and Akciová společnost Walter, továrna na automobily a letecké motory (1932) was an automotive manufacturer. The company was based in Prague, Czech Republic. The plant survived the war intact and in 1946 the company was nationalized as Motorlet n.p. Walter ceased making cars in 1951.

History

Josef Walter founded the company in 1911 to make motorcycles and motor tricycles. It started to make cars in 1913: firstly its own models Walter WI/WII/WII (1912-1914), Walter WZ/WIZ/WIZI (1919-1928), Walter P (1924-1928), Walter 4 B (1928-1930), Walter 6 B (1928-1931), Walter Super 6 (1930-1934), Walter Standard 6 (1930-1933), Walter Regent (1932-1937) and Walter Royal (1931-1932) and later the Walter Junior (Fiat 508), Walter Bijou (Fiat 514), Walter Princ (Fiat 522) and Walter Lord (Fiat 524) under licence.

By 1926 Walter was Czechoslovakia's fourth-largest car maker by sales volume. In 1929 it still held fourth place, and production peaked at 1,498 cars for the year. By 1932 Walter production had slumped to 217 cars for the year. The figure recovered to 474 in 1933 but fell again to 102 in 1936 and only 13 in 1937.

Walter ceased making cars in 1951.

Gallery Walter Cars

Production

Walter cars

Walter under Fiat Licence

References

Sources

External links

Companies of Czechoslovakia
Cars of the Czech Republic
Walter
Manufacturing companies established in 1911
Motor vehicle manufacturers of Czechoslovakia
Fiat